The Post Office Act 1977 (c 44) was an Act of Parliament of the United Kingdom, which regulated corporate governance at the Post Office. It required that employees had voting rights for the board of directors. It is generally thought to have proved successful, but was repealed in 1979.

Contents
Section 1(1) substituted 19 for 12 directors on the board, under the Post Office Act 1969 section 6(2).

Section 1(2) inserted a new section 6(2A) saying the maximum number would be reduced back to 12 on 31 March 1980, unless the Secretary of State made an order otherwise, draft approved by a resolution of each House of Parliament.

Operation
The first new board met in January 1978. Qualitative empirical work suggests that the board functioned harmoniously, and worker participation on the board was welcomed. The Conservative government was elected on 4 May 1979. It let the two year ‘experiment’ under the Post Office Act 1977 lapse. This was criticised in Parliament, but went ahead.

See also
UK labour law 
UK company law

References
E Batstone, A Ferner and M Terry, Unions on the board: an experiment in industrial democracy (1983)
Lord Winterbottom, HL Deb (21 July 1977) vol 386, cols 548-64, debate before sent to committee.
Secretary of State for Industry, Sir Keith Joseph, Hansard HC Deb (12 December 1979) vol 975, cols 1303-12. 
Viscount Trenchard, HL Deb (12 December 1979) vol 403 cols 1158-66

United Kingdom labour law
United Kingdom company law
United Kingdom Acts of Parliament 1977